This is the discography of R&B singer-songwriter Ray J.

Studio albums

EPs

Mixtapes

Soundtrack albums

Visual albums

Singles

As lead artist

As featured artist

Promotional singles

Guest appearances

Soundtracks

Other songs
 2016: Cut It Out (with Jay Sean)

Notes

References

External links
 Official website
 Ray J at AllMusic
 
 

Hip hop discographies
Rhythm and blues discographies